Gradiška may refer to:
 Gradiška, Bosnia and Herzegovina, a town in Republika Srpska, Bosnia and Herzegovina
 Stara Gradiška, a town in Croatia
 Nova Gradiška, a town in Croatia